Mangarla, also spelt Mangala,  is a Pama–Nyungan language of Western Australia. It is spoken by the Mangarla people of the north-western area of the Great Sandy Desert, inland from the coast.

Phoneme Inventory 
Mangala's phoneme inventory is typical of Australian languages, and is identical to the inventories of the other Marrngu languages. There are 17 consonant phonemes. 

Also typical of Australian languages, there are only three vowel phonemes.

References

Marrngu languages
Critically endangered languages